Legacies is an American fantasy drama television series, created by Julie Plec, that premiered on The CW on October 25, 2018. It is a spin-off of The Originals and features characters from both that series and its predecessor, The Vampire Diaries. On February 3, 2021, the series was renewed for a fourth season, which premiered on October 14, 2021. On May 12, 2022, it was reported that the fourth season would be its last season.

Series overview

Episodes

Season 1 (2018–19)

Season 2 (2019–20)

Season 3 (2021)

Season 4 (2021–22)

Ratings

Season 1

Season 2

Season 3

Season 4

Notes

References 

Lists of American horror-supernatural television series episodes